Rough Run is a tributary of West Branch Fishing Creek in Sullivan County and Columbia County, in Pennsylvania, in the United States. Glacial till and bedrock consisting of shale and sandstone can be found along the stream. It is named for the speed of its waters and the foliage along the sides of the stream.

Course
Rough Run begins on a plateau in Davidson Township, Sullivan County, not far from the edge of the West Branch Fishing Creek watershed. The stream flows south-southwest for a short distance before turning south-southeast and dropping off the plateau. It begins to descend steeply in a valley. After a few tenths of a mile, the stream turns south-southwest again and exits Sullivan County after several tenths of a mile.

Upon exiting Sullivan County, Rough Run enters Sugarloaf Township, Columbia County. It continues flowing south-southwest and steeply descending. After several tenths of a mile, the stream turns southwest for several hundred feet. It then turns south-southeast for several hundred feet and reaches the slope. The stream reaches its confluence with West Branch Fishing Creek immediately afterwards.

Geography and geology

For most of its length, Rough Run is on a glacial till known as the Wisconsinan Bouldery Till. The surface is largely covered with boulders and it is a diamict. It is upper reaches, the stream flows over bedrock consisting of sandstone and shale. The sandstone and shale are interbedded and are red and gray in color. The bedrock's diamict is reddish-brown to yellowish-brown.

Watershed
The stream is entirely within the United States Geological Survey quadrangle of Elk Grove. Its mouth is in the northernmost part of Sugarloaf Township, Columbia County.

History and etymology
Rough Run was entered into the Geographic Names Information System on August 2, 1979. Its identifier in the Geographic Names Information System is 1185512.

Rough Run is named for the rapid speed which its waters flow at and also for the dense foliage that occurs along it.

See also
List of tributaries of Fishing Creek (North Branch Susquehanna River)

References

Rivers of Sullivan County, Pennsylvania
Rivers of Columbia County, Pennsylvania
Tributaries of Fishing Creek (North Branch Susquehanna River)
Rivers of Pennsylvania